Belgique is the French name of Belgium, a country in Europe.

Belgique may also refer to:
 Belgique, Missouri.

See also 
 Belgic (disambiguation)